Paya-ngokto is a village in Kyain Seikgyi Township, Kawkareik District, in the Kayin State of Myanmar. It is located on the west bank of Zami River.

References

External links
 "Paya-ngokto Map — Satellite Images of Paya-ngokto" Maplandia World Gazetteer

Populated places in Kayin State